The 1915 Harvard Crimson football team represented Harvard University in the 1915 college football season. The Crimson finished with an 8–1 record under eighth-year head coach Percy Haughton. The sole loss was a 10–0 defeat against Cornell.  Walter Camp selected three Harvard players (tackle Joseph Gilman, halfback Richard King and fullback Eddie Mahan) as first-team members of his 1915 College Football All-America Team.

Schedule

References

Harvard
Harvard Crimson football seasons
Harvard Crimson football
1910s in Boston